SS William Byrd was a Liberty ship built in the United States during World War II. She was named after William Byrd, an American planter and author from Charles City County, in colonial Virginia. He is considered the founder of Richmond, Virginia.

Construction
William Byrd was laid down on 24 May 1943, under a Maritime Commission (MARCOM) contract, MC hull 1203, by the St. Johns River Shipbuilding Company, Jacksonville, Florida; she was sponsored by Miss Marjorie Byrd McCarty, a descendant of the namesake, she was launched on 20 August 1943.

History
She was allocated to the United Fruit Co., on 5 September 1943. On 11 March 1948, she was placed in the James River Reserve Fleet, Lee Hall, Virginia. On 11 August 1953, she was withdrawn from the fleet to be loaded with grain under the "Grain Program 1953", she returned loaded with grain on 28 August 1953. She was again withdrawn from the fleet on 2 June 1956, to have the grain unloaded, she returned reloaded on 30 June 1956. On 16 March 1960, she was withdrawn from the fleet to be unloaded, she returned empty on 28 March 1960. She was sold for scrapping, 22 January 1973, to Luria Brothers and Company, for $59,577.75. She was withdrawn from the fleet, 18 May 1973.

References

Bibliography

 
 
 
 

 

Liberty ships
Ships built in Jacksonville, Florida
1943 ships
James River Reserve Fleet
James River Reserve Fleet Grain Program